Abrosiomyia is a genus of flies in the family Stratiomyidae.

Species
Abrosiomyia bella Nagatomi, 1975
Abrosiomyia flavipes Yang, Zhang & Li, 2014
Abrosiomyia minuta Kertész, 1914

References

Stratiomyidae
Brachycera genera
Taxa named by Kálmán Kertész
Diptera of Asia